The 1904 Illinois Fighting Illini football team was an American football team that represented the University of Illinois during the 1904 Western Conference football season.  Coached by Arthur R. Hall, Justa Lindgren, Fred Lowenthal, and Clyde Matthews, the Illini compiled a 9–2–1 record and finished in fourth place in the Western Conference. Guard Charles A. Fairweather was the team captain.

Schedule

Awards and honors
 Claude Rothgeb, end
 Third-team selection by Walter Camp for the Collier's Weekly 1904 College Football All-America Team
 Selected as an All-American by Fred Lowenthal, coach of the University of Illinois
 John M. Haselwood, guard
 Selected as an All-American by Fred Lowenthal

References

Illinois
Illinois Fighting Illini football seasons
Illinois Fighting Illini football